Elizaville is a census-designated place and unincorporated community in Fleming County, Kentucky, United States. Its population was 181 as of the 2010 census. Elizaville has a post office with ZIP code 41037.

Demographics

History
A post office was established in Elizaville in 1819. The community has the name of a daughter of an early citizen.

Historic sites in Elizaville include the Elizaville Presbyterian Church and Elizaville Cemetery.

References

Census-designated places in Fleming County, Kentucky
Census-designated places in Kentucky
Unincorporated communities in Kentucky
Unincorporated communities in Fleming County, Kentucky